Emin Cəbrayilov (born 17 January 1978) is an Azerbaijani diver. He competed at the 1996 Summer Olympics and the 2000 Summer Olympics.

References

1978 births
Living people
Azerbaijani male divers
Olympic divers of Azerbaijan
Divers at the 1996 Summer Olympics
Divers at the 2000 Summer Olympics
Place of birth missing (living people)